Orica albovirgulata is a species of beetle in the family Cerambycidae, and the only species in the genus Orica. It was described by Fairmaire in 1888.

References

Pachystolini
Beetles described in 1888
Taxa named by Léon Fairmaire